Jack Greenwood may refer to:

 Jack Greenwood (footballer), former Australian rules footballer
 Jack Greenwood (soccer) (born 1999), Australian soccer player
 Jack Greenwood (athlete), American track and field athlete